Marketing ethics is an area of applied ethics which deals with the moral principles behind the operation and regulation of marketing. Some areas of marketing ethics (ethics of advertising and promotion) overlap with media and public relations ethics.

Two types of marketing ethics 
Marketing ethics is known to have similarities with business ethics. Marketing ethics, however, can be divided into two categories:

 Positive marketing ethics.
 Normative marketing ethics.

Positive marketing ethics looks at the statement "what is" when it comes to examining marketing practices, an example would be to research fraudulent advertising and keep a record of the violations. Normative marketing ethics looks at theories that dictate how moral marketing should take place. The same theories and substructures used in business ethics to determine its level of morality are used to analyze whether moral marketing is taking place in normative marketing ethics. The three structures are known as duty-based theories, virtue ethics, and utilitarianism.

Fundamental issues in the ethics of marketing

Frameworks of analysis for marketing: possible frameworks
 Value-oriented framework, analyzing ethical problems on the basis of the values which they infringe (e.g. honesty, autonomy, privacy, transparency). An example of such an approach is the American Marketing Association Code of Ethics.
 Stakeholder-oriented framework, analyzing ethical problems on the basis of whom they affect (e.g. consumers, competitors, society as a whole).
 Process-oriented framework, analyzing ethical problems in terms of the categories used by marketing specialists (e.g. research, price, promotion, placement).

None of these frameworks allows, by itself, a convenient and complete categorization of the great variety of issues in marketing ethics

Power-based analysis
Contrary to popular impressions, not all marketing is adversarial, and not all marketing is stacked in favour of the marketer. In marketing, the relationship between producer/consumer or buyer/seller can be adversarial or cooperative. For an example of cooperative marketing, see relationship marketing. If the marketing situation is adversarial, another dimension of difference emerges, describing the power balance 
between producer/consumer or buyer/seller. Power may be concentrated with the producer (caveat emptor),
but factors such as over-supply or legislation can shift the power towards the consumer (caveat vendor). Identifying where the power in the relationship lies and whether the power balance is relevant at all are important to understanding the background to an ethical dilemma in marketing ethics.

Is marketing inherently evil? 
A popularist anti-marketing stance commonly discussed in the blogosphere and popular literature is that any kind of marketing is inherently evil. The position is based on the argument that marketing necessarily commits at least one of three wrongs:
 Damaging personal autonomy. The victim of marketing in this case is the intended buyer whose right to self-determination is infringed.
 Causing harm to competitors. Excessively fierce competition and unethical marketing tactics are especially associated with saturated markets.
 Manipulating social values. The victim in this case is society as a whole, or the environment as well. The argument is that marketing promotes consumerism and waste. See also: affluenza, ethical consumerism, anti-consumerism.

Specific issues in marketing ethics

Market research
Market research is the collection and analysis of information about consumers, competitors and the effectiveness of marketing programs. With market research, businesses can make decisions based on how the responses of the market, leading to a better understanding of how the business has to adapt to the changing market. It is used to establish which portion of the population will or does purchase a product, based on age, gender, location, income level, and many other variables. This research allows companies to learn more about past, current, and potential customers, including their specific likes and dislikes. Meticulous codes of ethics have been devised by multiple professional institutions which aim to communicate conflicts that occur during the implementation of marketing research (The European Society of Marketing and Opinion Research, the Market Research Society, and the Council for Survey Research are a few examples).

Ethical danger points in market research include:
 Invasion of privacy..
 Stereotyping.
 Profit motive
Invasion of privacy

Without information from the public, it is difficult to do market research. As companies conduct research they also come into contact with confidential and personal information, which comes with a level of risk for both the business as well as the individual. At times this information can be sensitive and in the wrong hands, ethical abuse and misuse of sensitive data may happen. This is why the invasion of consumer privacy is still an issue in marketing research ethics. Today's consumers are bombarded with mail after using their email address to enter in a competition, thus becoming part of a business's mailing list. Therefore, companies are provided with critical information which they must not take advantage of but use in an ethical manner.

Stereotyping:

Portraying an ideal body, weight or physical appearance can have potential harmful effects on the individual such as low self-esteem issues or anorexia. Good marketing is ethical marketing, it is about pleasing and developing a strong relationship with customers in a caring manner by not primarily only focusing on achieving results in order to generate profit.

People affected by unethical market research:
 Public
 Respondents 
 Client
 Researcher

Approaches to privacy can, broadly, be divided into two categories: free market, and consumer protection.[31] In a free market approach, commercial entities are largely allowed to do what they wish, with the expectation that consumers will choose to do business with corporations that respect their privacy to a desired degree. If some companies are not sufficiently respectful of privacy, they will lose market share. In a consumer protection approach, in contrast, it is claimed that individuals may not have the time or knowledge to make informed choices, or may not have reasonable alternatives available.
Stereotyping occurs because any analysis of real populations needs to make approximations and place individuals into groups. However, if conducted irresponsibly, stereotyping can lead to a variety of ethically undesirable results. In the American Marketing Association Statement of Ethics, stereotyping is countered by the obligation to show respect ("acknowledge the basic human dignity of all stakeholders").

Profit motive:

Manipulation of information and personal data can take place during market research conducted by for-profit organizations because they have a profit motive. This motive can affect the accuracy and objectivity of the marketing research and create an exaggerated positive image of the organization's products and services in order to attract clients to invest in their business.

Market audience
Ethical danger points include:
 Excluding potential customers from the market: selective marketing is used to discourage demand from undesirable market sectors or disenfranchise them altogether.
 Targeting the vulnerable (e.g. children, the elderly).

Examples of unethical market exclusion or selective marketing are past industry attitudes to the gay, ethnic minority and
plus size markets. Contrary to the popular myth that ethics and profits do not mix,
the tapping of these markets has proved highly profitable. For example, 20% of US clothing sales are now plus-size. Another example is the selective marketing of health care, so that unprofitable sectors (i.e. the elderly) will not
attempt to take benefits to which they are entitled.
A further example of market exclusion is the pharmaceutical industry's exclusion of developing countries
from AIDS drugs.

Examples of marketing which unethically targets the elderly include: living trusts, time share fraud, mass marketing fraud and others.
The elderly hold a disproportionate amount of the world's wealth and are therefore the target of financial exploitation.

In the case of children, the main products are unhealthy food, fashionware and entertainment goods. Children are a lucrative market: "...children 12 and under spend more than $11 billion of their own money and influence family spending decisions worth another $165 billion", but are not capable of resisting or understanding marketing tactics at younger ages ("children don't understand persuasive intent until they are eight or nine years old"). At older ages competitive feelings towards other children are stronger than financial sense. The practice of extending children's marketing from television to the school grounds is also controversial (see marketing in schools). The following is a select list of online articles:
 Sharon Beder, Marketing to Children (University of Wollongong, 1998).
 Miriam H. Zoll, Psychologists Challenge Ethics of Marketing to Children, (2000).
 Donnell Alexander and Aliza Dichter, Ads and Kids: How young is too young?
 Rebecca Clay, Advertising to children: Is it ethical? (Monitor on Psychology, Volume 31, No. 8 September 2000), American Psychological Association
 Media Awareness Network. How marketers target kids.

Other vulnerable audiences include emerging markets in developing countries, where the public may not be sufficiently aware of skilled marketing ploys transferred from developed countries, and where, conversely, marketers may not be aware how excessively powerful their tactics may be. See Nestle infant milk formula scandal. Another vulnerable group are mentally unstable consumers. The definition of vulnerability is also problematic: for example, when should endebtedness be seen as a vulnerability and when should "cheap" loan providers be seen as loan sharks, unethically exploiting the economically disadvantaged?

Targeting the Vulnerable

Marketing targeting strategies for products that may cause economic, physical and psychological harm has become an aspect of marketing which is criticized a considerable amount, especially in marketing literature with a particular focus on vulnerable consumers

Children, elderly consumers, and economically disadvantaged consumers are often categorized as being a part of the vulnerable group in marketing, in terms of ethics. “Ethics and social responsibility communities seem to agree that targeting a vulnerable group with marketing campaigns that take advantage of their vulnerability is unjust”. George G Brenkert was amongst the first to raise the issue about taking advantage of the vulnerability of a person, which therefore makes marketing practices immoral or unjust. Adolescents and children in the US are major market force in the food and beverage industry and as a result, food marketers are “attracted to the youth as consumers because of their spending power, purchasing influences and as future adult consumers”. It is ethically wrong to target children especially when it comes to unhealthy food and beverages, as children may not want anything else, which could lead to child obesity. Children have difficulty deciding between the purpose of advertising and other modes of communication; therefore it is morally unacceptable to target vulnerable children with such products. In Belgium, it is banned to show commercials during children's programs, similarly in Australia, such ads are not allowed during television programs for preschoolers.  It is considered unethical to generate profits through marketing to vulnerable groups, such as children, the poor or the elderly.

The ethics of marketing practice, especially directed towards the vulnerable can be divided into two areas, product and process.

Process related ethical issues are often demonstrated through the use of deceptive or misleading advertising, where as product related issues is predominately focuses on marketing of certain “harmful” products such as tobacco, unhealthy food etc.

Excluding potential customers from the market:

There are certain high caution aspects of ethical marketing in terms of market audience. Using selective marketing to discourage demand from an unwanted market group or exclude them altogether. Examples of market exclusion or selective marketing are certain company's attitudes towards the gay, ethnic groups and overweight (plus size) market groups. Customers are treated like this because companies think that they are unprofitable so they try to deprive them or avoid them altogether.  It is often debated amongst the business community that in order to be profitable, often businesses have to be unethical. However, this idea is seemingly outdated as most businesses nowadays follow an ethical business plan. In the United States, plus size apparel is thought to have generated $17.5 billion between May 2013 and April 2014, which is a 5% increase from the previous year, this is to be expected as 65% of American women are plus sized . Another example of exclusion from the market is some pharmaceutical industry's exclude developing countries from AIDS drugs

Pricing ethics

Pricing ethics:

Pricing along with product, place and promotion are the four functions of marketing.  Retailers and producers must ensure that ethical pricing strategies are performed in order to earn profits without deceiving competitors or consumers .Issues in pricing ethics are related to fairness, specifically the fair treatment of buyers and sellers as well as fair competition. Ethical pricing practice happens when it allows the market to remain competitive and other players in the market are treated fairly. 

However buyers and sellers have different goals and perceived outcomes in the exchange process. Usually buyers are seeking to gain products and services at the best possible price whereas sellers are generally concentrated on generating maximum profit.

Price fixing:

Price fixing is maintaining a price at a certain level, which has been agreed upon between competing sellers and is illegal in most countries . When price fixing occurs and a price is set by an industry, customers are forced to pay the exorbitant price due to a lack of options.

Price fixing is thought to be unethical and socially irresponsible as it breaks laws that are specifically put into place to promote regular competition between companies . With competition between companies, business will be likely to keep costs low at affordable prices, in order to compete.

Horizontal price-fixing occurs when competitors in a market who are selling the same product or service come to decide on a mutual price that they will both set for their products or services. The anti-trust law in the United States as well as the competition law of the European Union state that horizontal-price fixing agreements are illegal because it creates a monopolistic market environment that can exploit consumers. 

Vertical price-fixing is also considered as illegal activity in the United States. This takes place when competitors in the same market enter into an agreement to set a mutual minimum or maximum resale price.

Price wars:

Price wars, is when businesses constantly lower its prices in an attempt to demoralize its competition . Price wars can create emotionally devastating and psychologically devastating situations, which has an extraordinary impact on an individual, a company and industry profits .  The intention of a price war is to drive competitors out of the market or to create an entry barrier into the market.  Although it is beneficial for consumers, as they will get the product or service at a low price, however they are often deprived for quality. Also in the long term, it will force other competitors out of business and lower profits threaten business survival.  If a company is involved in price war tactics, then it can be seen as unethical within the industry because they are starting a dangerous position and driving other companies to use similar tactics.  A companies overall goal is to maximize its profits and revenue, however through engaging in a price war they are unable to do this and are more likely making less money as they would have had they taken part in normal business competition. If price wars can be avoided, it will prove to be vital success for any business.

Price Collusion:

Price Collusion is when several companies get together in order to hold the price of a good or service at a raised level in the hopes of achieving large profits or restricting the market. Price fixing is sometimes called price collusion in order to emphasize the agreement using secretive, to avoid fair competition.

Pricing practices that are considered unethical in most geographic markets include:
 Bid rigging
 Dumping (pricing policy)
 Predatory pricing
 Price gouging
 Price fixing
 Supra competitive pricing

List of pricing practices which may be unethical in certain circumstances and should be used with caution:
 Price discrimination (except where differential prices can be justified on economic grounds, such as discounts for volume purchasers)
 Price skimming
 Price war
 Variable pricing

Ethics in advertising and promotion
Advertising is mass and paid communication, with a fundamental purpose to deliver information, acquire attitudes and induce action beneficial to the advertiser – generally the sale of the product or service.   Advertising and promotion have a significant influence on people, society in large, while shaping their attitudes, behaviors and priorities . Some scholars believe that advertising supports ethical issues. It is also considered unethical to shame a substitute or rivals product or services (Srivastava & Nandan, 2010). Other ethical issues include, mistreatment of women, advertising to children, misleading advertising and other issues, which lead to ethical decline of society. Mistreatment of women is evident immensely in advertisements. Often women are matched up with household products such as cleaning supplies and are shown as doing domestic work, which represents stereotyping of women. Women are also often used as sex symbols, to convey particular messages about products. Also men are often apparent in DIY (do it yourself) ads, which deliver the idea of them being a “handy man. An ad, which demonstrates ethical features, is truthful, it doesn’t make false claims, and it provides sufficient information for the buyer to make informed choices. Exhibiting a level of respect and dignity for its buyers is important while demonstrating decency. An example of an advert produced by Coca Cola, through using false advertising, it showed unethical issues behind its production. Coca Cola used of Karl Langerfeld (Chanel designer) who had claimed to lose 80 pounds on a diet that was mainly attributed to diet coke, “I drink diet coke from the minute I get up to the minute I go to bed and I drink nothing else”. This advert was specially targeted towards women as it aimed to be conveyed as a fashion trend, through the use of a famous fashion designer. Coke used thin models and world-renowned fashion designers both of whom are cautious of body image, which shows the wrong message for women, especially young women. The advert shows that going overboard with dieting is conventional and that diet coke is the way of going about achieving a thin and attractive body. It is ethically wrong to be using Karl Lagerfeld's extreme dieting ways in order to promote diet coke. It is not only advocating an extreme statement, but it is also sending the wrong message about the drink by directly associating it to a “healthy ideal body”. Often the line between ethical and unethical advertising is blurred, what may seem unethical to some consumers or businesses, may not to for others. Therefore, in cases like this, businesses should proceed with caution, because unethical advertising and promotion can fail, causing consumers to shy away from the company consequently defeating the purpose of any campaign. 

Ethical pitfalls in advertising and promotional content include:
 Issues over truth and honesty. In the 1940s and 1950s, tobacco used to be advertised as promoting health. Today an advertiser who fails to tell the truth not only offends against morality but also against the law. However the law permits "puffery" (a legal term). The difference between mere puffery and fraud is a slippery slope: "The problem... is the slippery slope by which variations on puffery can descend fairly quickly to lies." See main article: false advertising.
 Issues with violence, sex and profanity. Sexual innuendo is a mainstay of advertising content (see sex in advertising), and yet is also regarded as a form of sexual harassment. Violence is an issue especially for children's advertising and advertising likely to be seen by children.
 Taste and controversy. The advertising of certain products may strongly offend some people while being in the interests of others. Examples include: feminine hygiene products, hemorrhoid and constipation medication. The advertising of condoms has become acceptable in the interests of AIDS-prevention, but are nevertheless seen by some as promoting promiscuity. Some companies have actually marketed themselves on the basis of controversial advertising - see Benetton. Sony has also frequently attracted criticism for unethical content (portrayals of Jesus which infuriated religious groups; racial innuendo in marketing black and white versions of its PSP product; graffiti adverts in major US cities).
 Negative advertising techniques, such as attack ads. In negative advertising, the advertiser highlights the disadvantages of competitor products rather than the advantages of their own. The methods are most familiar from the political sphere: see negative campaigning.
 Delivery channels
 Direct marketing is the most controversial of advertising channels, particularly when approaches are unsolicited. TV commercials and direct mail are common examples. Electronic spam and telemarketing push the borders of ethics and legality more strongly, and have been described as attention theft.
 Shills and astroturfers are examples of ways for delivering a marketing message under the guise of independent product reviews and endorsements, or creating supposedly independent watchdog or review organizations. For example, fake reviews can be published on Amazon. Shills are primarily for message-delivery, but they can also be used to drive up prices in auctions, such as eBay auctions.
 Native advertising is the blurring of lines between advertising and content.

Deceptive Advertising and Ethics
Another breach of marketing ethics has to do with the use of deceptive advertising. This form of advertising is not specific to one target market, and can sometimes go unnoticed by the public. There are a number of different ways in which deceptive marketing can be presented to consumers; one of these methods is accomplished through the use of humor. In a study conducted by Hassib Shabbir and Des Thwaites, 238 advertisements were assessed and 73.5% of them were found to have used deceptive marketing practices. Of those advertisements that were conducted deceptively, 74.5% of them used humor as a masking device in order to mislead potential customers. Part of what drives this study is the idea that humor provides an escape or relief from some kind of human constraint, and that some advertisers intend to take advantage of this by deceptively advertising a product that can potentially alleviate that constraint through humor. Through the study it was also found that all types of humor are used to deceive consumers, and that there are certain types of humor that are used when making certain deceptive claims.

It is important to understand that humor is not the only method that is used to deter consumer's minds from what a product actually offers. Before making important purchases, one should always conduct their own research in order to gain a better understanding of what it is they are investing in.

The use of ethics as a marketing tactic
Business ethics has been an increasing concern among larger companies, at least since the 1990s. Major corporations increasingly fear the damage to their image associated with press revelations of unethical practices. Marketers have been among the fastest to perceive the market's preference for ethical companies, often moving faster to take advantage of this shift in consumer taste. This results in the expropriation of ethics itself as a selling point or a component of a corporate image.
 The Body Shop is an example of a company which marketed itself and its entire product range solely on an ethical message.
Greenwash is an example of a strategy used to make a company appear ethical when its unethical practices continue.
 Liberation marketing is another strategy whereby a product can masquerade behind an image that appeals to a range of values, including ethical values related to lifestyle and anti-consumerism.
"Liberation marketing takes the old mass culture critique — consumerism as conformity — fully into account, acknowledges it, addresses it, and solves it. Liberation marketing imagines consumers breaking free from the old enforcers of order, tearing loose from the shackles with which capitalism has bound us, escaping the routine of bureaucracy and hierarchy, getting in touch with our true selves, and finally, finding authenticity, that holiest of consumer grails." (Thomas Frank)

Neuromarketing ethics
Neuromarketing and its precursor, neuroeconomics, uses clinical information about brain functions and mechanisms to help explain what is happening inside of the “black box” so prevalent in many explanations of consumer behavior. In order to do so, specialists use neuroimaging techniques and record brain responses to different stimuli.
The Neuromarketing Science & Business Association has launched on November 2012 a Neuromarketing Code of Ethics. This is a first step towards adopting international standards applied to using neuroscientific methods to study the effectiveness of advertising campaigns, packaging and product design, as well as communication campaigns from non-profit organizations and government institutions.  However, some ethicists condemn the code as protecting only a very narrow class, and in the extreme position that neuromarketing itself should only be used for the advancement of what is reasonably believed to be public good, employing Thomas Aquinas' doctrine of double effect (DDE).  Although one could make the argument that engineering profit serves the public good, it would not be saved under the DDE because the intention behind it is not to generate a greater good than to which the collective harm of manipulation is greater.  However, neuromarketing programs to encourage healthy lifestyle choices may be saved under the DDE, provided it is based on good scientific information in the first place, such as regular exercise.

Marketing strategy
The main theoretical issue here is the debate between free markets and regulated markets.
In a truly free market, any participant can make or change the rules. However, when new rules are invented which shift power too suddenly or too far, other participants may respond with accusations of unethical behaviour, rather than modifying their own behaviour to suit (which they might not be able to anyway). Most markets are not fully free: the real debate is as to the appropriate extent of regulation.

Case: California electricity crisis, which demonstrates how constant innovation of new marketing strategies by companies such as Enron outwitted the regulatory bodies and caused substantial harm to consumers and competitors.

A list of known unethical or controversial marketing strategies:
 Anti-competitive practices
 Bait and switch
 Planned obsolescence
 Pyramid scheme
 Vendor lock-in / Vendor lock-out
 Viral marketing / guerilla marketing
 Subliminal advertising

Controversial marketing strategies associated with the internet:
 Embrace, extend and extinguish
 Search engine optimisation
 Spamdexing
 Spyware / Adware

Further issues in marketing ethics 
Marketing ethics overlaps with environmental ethics in respect of waste problems associated with the packaging of products.

Some, such as members of the advocacy group No Free Lunch, have argued that marketing by pharmaceutical companies is negatively impacting physicians' prescribing practices, influencing them to prescribe the marketed drugs rather than others which may be cheaper or better for the patient.

Ethical thinking is responding to situations that deal with principles concerning human behavior in respect to the appropriateness and inappropriateness of certain communication and to the decency and indecency of the intention and results of such actions.  In other words, ethics are distinctions between right and wrong.  Businesses are confronted with ethical decision making every day, and whether employees decide to use ethics as a guiding force when conducting business is something that business leaders, such as managers, need to instill. Marketers are ethically responsible for what is marketed and the image that a product portrays.  With that said, marketers need to understand what good ethics are and how to incorporate good ethics in various marketing campaigns to better reach a targeted audience and to gain trust from customers.

Marketing ethics, regardless of the product offered or the market targeted, sets the guidelines for which good marketing is practiced.  When companies create high ethical standards upon which to approach marketing they are participating in ethical marketing. To market ethically and effectively one should be reminded that all marketing decisions and efforts are necessary to meet and suit the needs of customers, suppliers, and business partners.  Ethical behavior should be enforced throughout company culture and through company practices.

However, marketers have been known to market questionable products to the public.  These tend to be controversial products in that they appeal to some while offending others. An example of such a product that is sold regularly today is a cheap handgun. America is a country in which its citizens have the right to bear arms, yet these weapons are criticized by the public because they are sold at a low price making it rather easy to purchase by members of less affluent communities. Critics have referred to these weapons as " Saturday Night Specials" referring to the negative connotation that they are purchased to commit crimes. In defense of the critics opinions, if in fact these guns are purchased with the intent to commit such crimes, than one must question the ethics behind marketing these products to criminals. Is the marketer facilitating the crime by appealing to this target market with a weapon that is easily accessible?  While  the argument in this case may seem unethical due to the questionable nature of these cheap handguns, this argument does not apply to the sale of all guns. That is because weapons that are legally sold to customers at an affordable rate for safety purposes, self-defense, hunting, and law enforcement are perfectly ethical due to the fact that they are safe product that is marketed to a responsible consumer. This comparison supports the fact that ethical marketing can be perceived differently by consumers depending on the nature of the product that is being sold.

Regulation and enforcement

Marketing ethics and marketing law are related subjects. Relevant areas of law include consumer law which protects consumers and antitrust law which protects competitors - in both cases, against unethical marketing practices. Regulation extends beyond the law to lobbies, watchdog bodies and self-regulatory industry bodies.
 Advertising regulation
 Consumer protection

See also 
 Consumerism
 Customer relationship management
 Ethical marketing
 False advertising
 Marketing
 Marketing warfare strategies
 Media ethics
 Propaganda
 Socially responsible marketing

References

Bibliography 
 
 

 
 
 CNBC. (2015, April 8). Retail's plus-size problem: Designing for larger sizes. Retrieved March 31, 2016, from http://www.cnbc.com/2015/04/08/retails-plus-size-problem-designing-for-larger-sizes.html
 Colley, R. (1961). Defining advertising goals for measured advertising results. New York .
 
 Ellis, N., Fitchett, J., Higgins, M., Jack, G., Lim, M., Saren, M., et al. (2011). Marketing: A Critical Textbook. United Kingdom
 
 Harvard Business Review. (2000, March). How to Fight a Price War. Retrieved March 28, 2016, from https://hbr.org/2000/03/how-to-fight-a-price-war
 
 Mahmood, A., & Vulkan, N. (2013). How does dominance and competition affect the use of consumer information? Evidence from a famed field experiment. Retrieved from
 
 Melé, D. (2009). Business Ethics in Action: Seeking Human Excellence in Organizations. United Kingdom
 
 Outterson, K. (2004). Pharmaceutical Arbitrage: balancing access and innovation in international prescription drug markets. Retrieved from http://www.who.int/intellectualproperty/news/en/Submission5.pdf
 
 Peppin, J. (1998). Price-Fixing Agreements under the Sherman AntiTrust Law. 299–303. Retrieved from http://scholarship.law.berkeley.edu/cgi/viewcontent.cgi?article=3704&context=californialawreview
 Srivastava, V., & Nandan, T. (2010). A Study of Perceptions in Society Regarding Unethical Practices in Advertising. South Asia Journal of Management , 61–69.
 Story, M., & French, S. (2004). Food Advertising and Marketing Directed at Children and Adolescents in the US. International Journal of Behavioral Nutrition and Physical Activity , 1–3. doi: 10.1186/1479-5868-1-3
 The Guardian . (2013, January 12). How Diet Coke became fashion's favourite fizz. Retrieved April 1, 2016, from the guardian : http://www.theguardian.com/fashion/2013/jan/12/diet-coke-fashion-favourite-fizz

External links 
 American Marketing Association Statement of Ethics (2004)
 "Ethics in Marketing." Encyclopedia of Business and Finance. Mohandeep Singh. Thomson Gale, 2001. eNotes.  2006. 16 Oct, 2006
 Marketing Ethics Resources from the Center for the Study of Ethics in the Professions, Illinois Institute of Technology.
 Direct Marketing Association, Guidelines for Ethical Business Practice (September 2006)
 The Catholic Church's Handbook on Ethics in Advertising
 Federal Trade Commission, FTC Guidelines on Advertising

Business ethics
Marketing